The 2002 West Coast Conference men's basketball tournament took place March 2–4, 2002. All rounds were held in San Diego, California at the Jenny Craig Pavilion. The semifinals were televised by ESPN2. The West Coast Conference Championship Game was televised by ESPN.

The Gonzaga Bulldogs earned their fourth straight WCC Tournament title and an automatic bid to the 2002 NCAA tournament. Dan Dickau of Gonzaga was named Tournament MVP for the second straight year.

Format
With eight teams participating, all eight teams were placed into the first round, with teams seeded and paired based on regular-season records. After the first round, teams were re-seeded so the highest-remaining team was paired with the lowest-remaining time in one semifinal with the other two teams slotted into the other semifinal.

Bracket

See also 
West Coast Conference

References

Tournament
West Coast Conference men's basketball tournament
West Coast Athletic Conference men's basketball tournament
West Coast Athletic Conference men's basketball tournament